Louis Félix Amiel, a French portrait painter, was born at Castelnaudary (Aude) in 1802. He was a pupil of Baron Gros, and died at Joinville-le-Pont in 1864.

References
 

1802 births
1864 deaths
People from Castelnaudary
19th-century French painters
French male painters
Pupils of Antoine-Jean Gros
19th-century French male artists